The Order of Saint George is the highest military decoration of the Russian Federation. Originally established on 26 November 1769 Julian (7 December 1769 Gregorian) as the highest military decoration of the Russian Empire for commissioned officers and generals by Empress Catherine the Great. After the October Revolution in 1917, it was awarded by the White movement under Alexander Kolchak until their collapse in 1921. The order was revived in the Russian Federation on 20 March 1992 by Decree №1463 of the President of Russia. The current award criteria were amended on 7 September 2010 by Presidential Decree 1099.

Statute of the Order of St. George 

The current Order of Saint George is awarded to highest and senior military officers for the conduct of military operations to protect the Motherland from attack by an external enemy which resulted in the complete defeat of the enemy, for the execution of combat and other operations in other states aimed at restoring international peace and security, or for being a model of military science with feats that exemplify military prowess; the Order is also conferred upon officers who were previously awarded state awards of the Russian Federation for distinction in combat.

Description 
The Order of Saint George is divided into four classes, from the First Class to the Fourth class; the highest degree being the Order First class. The four classes are awarded sequentially from the fourth to the first.  These four classes are individually identified by the size and manner of wearing the two principal insignia of the Order, the cross and the star.

Cross: A white enamelled cross pattée with a central medallion bearing the image of Saint George on horseback slaying the dragon. The cross measures 60mm across in the case of the Order first class and is worn on a sash in the colours of Saint George (orange and black).  The same 60mm cross is worn around the neck on a 45mm wide ribbon also in the colours of Saint George for the Order second class.  The cross is 50mm across for the Order third class and is also worn around the neck but from a 24mm wide ribbon in the same colours. The Order fourth class is a 40mm cross worn on the left breast hanging from a pentagonal mount covered with a 24mm wide ribbon of Saint George.

Star: A four-pointed silver gilt star with a gold central medallion bearing the cipher of Saint George "SG" topped by a crown and surrounded by a black enamelled band bearing the motto of the order "For Service and Bravery" ("Za Sluzhbu i Khrabrost"). The star is worn on the left breast for both the Order first and second classes.

Ribbon: The ribbon of the Order of Saint George is orange with three black stripes, commonly called "George's Ribbon". It symbolises fire and gunpowder: the Russian colours of military glory, and is also thought to be derived from the colours of the original Russian imperial coat of arms (black eagle on a golden background). It was subsequently associated with the colors of the Russian and Soviet Guard units. Unlike the other classes, the Order of Saint George fourth class can be awarded to junior officers while the rest is for senior and flag officers.

 The ribbon bar for the Order first class is adorned with a miniature golden star.
 The ribbon bar for the Order second class is adorned with a miniature silver star.
 The ribbon bar for the Order third class is adorned with a miniature white cross.
 The ribbon bar for the Order fourth class has no device.

Recipients (partial list)

Recipients of the Order first class 
25 people were ever awarded The First class cross, one should be a King or win a war to receive it. The full list goes as follows in timeline order:
 Catherine the Great
 Pyotr Rumyantsev
 Alexei Grigoryevich Orlov
 Petr Ivanovich Panin
 Vasily Dolgorukov-Krymsky
 Grigory Potemkin
 Alexander Suvorov
 Vasily Chichagov
 Nikolai Vasilyeich Repnin
 Mikhail Kutuzov
 Michael Andreas Barclay de Tolly
 King  Charles XIV John of Sweden
 Gebhard Leberecht von Blücher
 Karl Philipp, Prince of Schwarzenberg
 Arthur Wellesley, 1st Duke of Wellington
 Levin August von Bennigsen
 Louis Antoine, Duke of Angoulême
 Ivan Paskevich
 Hans Karl von Diebitsch
 Joseph Radetzky von Radetz
 Alexander II of Russia
 William I, German Emperor
 Archduke Albrecht, Duke of Teschen
 Grand Duke Michael Nikolaevich of Russia
  Grand Duke Nicholas Nikolaevich of Russia

Recipients of the Order second class 
For The Second class one should win a Campaign. The first recipient was Lieutenant-General Plemyannikov for the Battle of Kagul, the last of 124 or 125, depending on sources, was either Nikolai Yudenich or Marshal of France Ferdinand Foch.
 Grand Duke Nicholas Nikolaevich of Russia (1856–1929)
 Field Marshal of the Russian Empire Mikhail Kutuzov
 Field Marshal of the Russian Empire  Barclay de Tolly
 General of the Army Nikolay Yegorovich Makarov
 Colonel General Alexander Zelin
 General of the Army Vladimir Boldyrev

Recipients of the Order third class 
King Leopold I of Belgium.
 Grand Duke Nicholas Nikolaevich of Russia (1856–1929)
 Field Marshal of the Russian Empire Mikhail Kutuzov
 Field Marshal of the Russian Empire  Barclay de Tolly
 General Alexei Brusilov
 General Yevgeni Iskritsky
 General Samad bey Mehmandarov
 General of the Army Sergey Surovikin
 Private George Phillips (Newfoundland Regiment) Beaumont Hamel

Recipients of the Order fourth class 
 Nicholas II of Russia
 General Alexei Brusilov
 General Yevgeni Iskritsky
 Vladimir Gittis, Imperial colonel and Red Army general
 Colonel Lambros Katsonis, Greek 18th century revolutionary
 Colonel General Sergei Makarov
 Lieutenant General Vladimir Shamanov
 Lieutenant Colonel Anatoly Lebed
 British Captain Albert Ball, World War I fighter pilot
 Dutch War Correspondent Louis Grondijs, World War I, White Army, Russian Civil War
 Major General Carl Gustaf Emil Mannerheim, Imperial Russia, WWI
 General Pyotr Nikolayevich Wrangel, Imperial Russia, World War I, White Army, Russian Civil War
 Brigadier John Alexander Sinton, Indian Army, WWI
 Field Marshal Franz Joseph, Emperor of Austria and King of Hungary
 Major General Hermann Christoph Gamper, Imperial Russian cavalry commander during the Patriotic War of 1812
 African Spir (Battle of Malakoff, 1855)
 Baron Roman von Ungern-Sternberg
 Field Marshal of the Russian Empire Mikhail Kutuzov
 Field Marshal of the Russian Empire  Barclay de Tolly
 Ilija Plamenac, vojvoda and military commander
 Field Marshal Živojin Mišić
 Sir John Elley, British officer in the Napoleonic Wars
 Bogdan Zimonjić, Serbian Orthodox priest, vojvoda, senator and military commander 
 Anatoly Pepelyayev,  White Russian general
 Lieutenant General Grigory Mikhaylovich Semyonov, Cossack-Buriat White Army General
 Royce Coleman Dyer, Canadian Army captain
 Major General Pyotr Mikhailovich Skarzhinsky
 Aslan ibn Shahmardan, khan of the Gazikumukh (Kura) Khanate
 2nd Lieutenant Vladimir Kotlinsky, commander of the Osowiec Fortress during the Attack of the Dead Men

See also
 Cross of Saint George
 Gold Sword for Bravery
 Ribbon of Saint George
 Awards and decorations of the Russian Federation

References

Further reading
Voennyĭ orden sviatogo velikomuchenika i pobedonostsa Georgiia: imennye spiski 1769 – 1920; biobibliograficheskiĭ spravochnik / otvetstvennyĭ sostavitel' V. M. Shabanov. Moskva 2004,

External links
 The Commission on State Awards to the President of the Russian Federation
 

Awards established in 2000
 
Orders of chivalry of the Russian Empire
Orders of chivalry of Russia
1760s establishments in the Russian Empire
1769 establishments in the Russian Empire